The Heineken Experience, located in Amsterdam, is a historic brewery and corporate visitor center for the internationally distributed Dutch pilsner, Heineken beer.

History

Background 
The industrial facility was built as the first Heineken brewery in 1867, serving as the company's primary brewing facility until 1988 when a more modern, larger facility was constructed on the outskirts of the city.

Foundation 
In 1991, the brewery opened its doors to the public through a visitor centre, known as the "Heineken Treat and Information Centre". Although the Heineken Experience began in 1991, there were tours of the original brewery while it was still fully operational. The attraction grew to become one of Amsterdam's most popular tourist attractions and by 2001 the visitor centre changed its name to "Heineken Experience".

Expansion and Reforms 
After a year of extensive remodeling and expansion, the Heineken Experience reopened to visitors on 3 November 2008.  The latest transformation of the visitor experience comprises four levels of historical artifacts, product exploration and sampling, and interactive exhibits which employ the latest high-tech multi-media technologies.

The museum underwent a renovation and expansion process from 2021 to the end of November 2022, which lasted approximately fourteen months. During this period, the façade and entrance were renovated and the Reception Center was expanded in order to put an end to the queue of people in the street.

Redesign

In renovating this visitor experience, the brewery tour was designed to educate the public on the process of pilsner brewing as well as to bringing the Heineken product and brand to life.  As described by branding expert Bob Rogers of BRC Imagination Arts, an experience design firm based in Burbank, California, commissioned to design the visitor center renovations: "We wanted to bring back the connection with beer-making, and the history of Heineken, to help people see it, touch it, taste it".

European Route of Industrial Heritage Site

While the original brewing facility which houses the Heineken Experience is an historic landmark for the Heineken company, it serves also as an Anchor Point on the European Route of Industrial Heritage.  The European Route of Industrial Heritage presents 845 sites in 29 European countries. Of these, 66 Anchor Points comprise the ERIH main route. In whole, eleven Regional Routes host the industrial history of the European landscape in detail, and all sites relate to ten European Theme Routes which show the diversity of European industrial history and their common roots.

References

External links 

 Heineken Experience

1991 establishments in the Netherlands
Amsterdam-Zuid
Beer museums
European Route of Industrial Heritage Anchor Points
Heineken
Museums established in 1991
Museums in Amsterdam
Beer in the Netherlands
20th-century architecture in the Netherlands